Kavirat Rural District is a rural district (dehestan) in Kavirat District, Aran va Bidgol County, Isfahan Province, Iran. At the 2006 census, its population was 3,650, in 958 families.  The rural district has 14 villages.

References 

Rural Districts of Isfahan Province
Aran va Bidgol County